Kohlmeyeriella is a genus of fungi within the Lulworthiaceae family.

The genus name of Kohlmeyeriella is in honour of Jan Justus Kohlmeyer (b.1928), a (German born) American botanist (Mycology) from the University of North Carolina.

The genus was circumscribed by Evan Benjamin Gareth Jones, R.G. Johnson and Stephen Thomas Moss in Bot. J. Linn. Soc. vol.87 on page 208 in 1983.

References

Sordariomycetes genera
Lulworthiales